Aktashevo (Aqtaş) is a rural locality (a village) in Ivanovsky Selsoviet, Khaybullinsky District, Bashkortostan, Russia. The population was 140 as of 2010. There are 3 streets.

Geography 
Aktashevo is located 42 km northwest of Akyar (the district's administrative centre) by road. Pugachevo is the nearest rural locality.

References 

Rural localities in Khaybullinsky District